Criminal Minds is a media franchise of American television programs created by Jeff Davis. The police procedural thriller series follow the work of the members of the Behavioral Analysis Unit (BAU) of the FBI. 

The original television series Criminal Minds premiered on September 22, 2005 to February 19, 2020 on CBS, followed by spin-offs Criminal Minds: Suspect Behavior and Criminal Minds: Beyond Borders which premiered on the same network on February 16, 2011 and March 16, 2016 respectively. In April 2012, a video game was released based on the series.
In February 2021, it was announced that a 10-episode revival of original series was officially greenlit by Paramount+. A planned true-crime docuseries, titled The Real Criminal Minds was also ordered by Paramount+.

Over the course of Criminal Minds, a total of 363 episodes of the Criminal Minds franchise have aired, concluding its original series to end the franchise not long ago with its fifteenth and final season, respectively.

Overview

Criminal Minds

Criminal Minds which premiered on September 22, 2005 is set primarily at the BAU based in Quantico, Virginia, and focuses on profiling the criminal, called the unsub (unknown subject), rather than the actual crime itself. The focal point of the series follows a group of FBI profilers who set about catching various criminals through behavioral profiling. The plot focuses on the team working cases and the personal lives of the characters, depicting the hardened life and statutory requirements of a profiler.

Criminal Minds: Suspect Behavior

In early 2009, Michael Ausiello from Entertainment Weekly said that he and studios were discussing the possibility of a spin-off of the procedural crime drama Criminal Minds. Studio Producer Ed Bernero confirmed it by disclosing that "it's safe to say there will be something soon." The show had a completely new cast, with the exception of Kirsten Vangsness, who reprised her role as Penelope Garcia. By late 2010, the director had been chosen, and the casting completed. It was announced that Forest Whitaker would star. Whitaker's character, Samuel "Sam" "Coop" Cooper, and his team were introduced in Criminal Minds Season 5. Richard Schiff had a recurring role as FBI Director Jack Fickler.

The series centers on the FBI's Behavioral Analysis Unit Red cell team a hand-picked elite team which operates outside of the Bureaucracy way. The team is led by veteran FBI profiler SSA Sam Cooper and they report only to the Director of the FBI.

Criminal Minds: Beyond Borders
A proposed new series in the Criminal Minds franchise was announced in January 2015 entitled Criminal Minds: Beyond Borders. Gary Sinise and Anna Gunn had been cast in the lead roles of Jack Garrett and Lily Lambert, with Tyler James Williams and Daniel Henney being cast as Russ "Monty" Montgomery and Matthew "Matt" Simmons, respectively. Criminal Minds: Beyond Borders follows an elite team of FBI agents solving cases that involve American citizens on international soil. CBS aired a backdoor pilot on an episode of Criminal Minds on April 8, 2015, introducing the characters with a crossover episode titled "Beyond Borders".

On May 8, 2015, CBS announced that Criminal Minds: Beyond Borders, has been picked up for the 2015–16 season, however, it was soon announced that Gunn had departed the series, with Alana de la Garza and Annie Funke further being cast as series regulars.
The series was originally intended to premiere on March 2, 2016, but was pushed back by two weeks and instead premiered on March 16, 2016, and filled the Wednesday 10:00pm time slot, airing immediately after the original Criminal Minds. On May 16, 2016, CBS renewed the series for a second season. On May 14, 2017, CBS canceled the series after two seasons due to low ratings.

Criminal Minds: Evolution 

In February 2021, a revival of the series was in early development at Paramount+, with a 10-episode sixtheenth-season revival officially greenlit. As of the Television Critics Association winter press tour a year later, it is still in development. In July 2022, Paramount+ officially gave the revival a full season order. The main cast of the previous seasons are all set to return, with the absence of Daniel Henney and Matthew Gray Gubler, the latter who has been with the series since the first episode. It begin filming in August 2022.

Series

Characters

Crossovers

Video game
CBS announced in October 2009 that Legacy Interactive would develop a video game based on the show. The game would require players to examine crime scenes for clues to help solve murder mysteries. The interactive puzzle game was released in 2012, but the show's cast was not involved with the project so it did not feature any of their voices.

References

Television franchises
Criminal Minds
Mass media franchises